Len Munsil is an American  attorney and the President of Arizona Christian University. He was the Arizona Republican Party nominee for Governor of Arizona in the 2006 gubernatorial election, coming from behind to upset Don Goldwater in the Republican primary in his first run for any elective office. He lost to incumbent Janet Napolitano in the general election on November 7, 2006. In 2016 he served as a delegate to the Republican National Convention in Cleveland, and a member of the GOP Platform Committee.

Munsil was the founding President for the Center for Arizona Policy, serving from 1996 to 2005. On November 17, 2011 he was  announced as the permanent president of Arizona Christian University

Personal background
In 2010, Munsil was named as the 6th President in the 50-year history of Southwestern College in Phoenix, Arizona. Munsil had been a member of the Board of Trustees for six years and an adjunct professor, teaching ethics, political science and pre-law courses at the College since 1994.

In his first year as President, Munsil implemented a name change to Arizona Christian University, invited President George W. Bush to speak at the school's 50th anniversary, drawing 1,260 supporters and raising more than $1.5 million, and presided over the school's largest enrollment and largest freshman class in history. Under his leadership, ACU raised its visibility, expanded its course offerings and majors, undertook campus renovations and building projects, dramatically increased fundraising and experienced large enrollment gains.  ACU seeks to attract students who will "transform culture with truth" – building biblical influence in every corner of society. In 2015 he wrote "Transforming Culture With Truth," explaining how ACU's Core Commitments reflect the biblical principles and values that built Western Civilization, and how young people committed to biblical truth are needed in leadership today. After four straight years of record enrollment, in 2017 Arizona Christian University was recognized for the first time in its history as a "Best College" by U.S. News & World Report, placing 16th among Best Regional Colleges in the 15-state Western region, and the highest-ranked university in its category in the state of Arizona.
 
Munsil is also known as the founder of the Center for Arizona Policy, a public policy organization emphasizing socially conservative issues. Munsil personally drafted and lobbied seven of the more than 60 laws promoted by CAP since its founding in 1996.

Munsil attended Arizona State University and was the editor of the university's newspaper, The State Press.  Under Munsil the editorial direction of the paper became conservative—particularly toward faculty members viewed by Munsil and his student journalist colleagues as too leftist. Munsil was selected Outstanding Journalism Graduate of the Walter Cronkite School of Journalism/Telecommunications.

Munsil has been a licensed attorney since 1988. He is admitted to practice in Arizona and federal courts, including eight U.S. Circuit Courts of Appeal and the United States Supreme Court. He has authored numerous amicus curiae briefs for the U.S. Supreme Court.  Munsil served in a judicial clerkship for Judge Daniel A. Manion of the U.S. Court of Appeals for the Seventh Circuit and was  appointed by former Arizona Governor Fife Symington to the Arizona Juvenile Justice Advisory Council. He is author or co-author of two legal manuals.

Len and his wife Tracy have eight adult children and reside in Scottsdale. Dr. Tracy Munsil earned her master's degree and her Ph.D. in Political Science from Arizona State University, where she taught full-time in the School of Politics and Global Studies. Dr. Munsil is now an Associate Professor of Political Science and Chair of the General Education Department at Arizona Christian University, and also chaired the Liberal Arts task force. In 2015 she was appointed by Arizona Gov. Doug Ducey and confirmed by the Arizona Senate for a four-year term on the Arizona Commission on Appellate Court Appointments. Like her husband, she is a former Outstanding Journalism Graduate at ASU, and Editor of the State Press. She home educated for 14 years.

On his father's side Munsil is descended from five signers of The Mayflower Compact and about a dozen men who fought in the American Revolution.

2006 gubernatorial election
During the campaign, Munsil was endorsed by four Republican Congressmen from Arizona: Jeff Flake,
Trent Franks, Rick Renzi, and John Shadegg. He was also endorsed by Senator John McCain and more than 30 state legislators.

Early polls suggested that Munsil had significant ground to make up in the primary, indicating in July that he had a mere 12% of Republican voters behind him. Don Goldwater, nephew of the late U.S. Senator and presidential candidate Barry Goldwater, came in second in a four-way Republican primary election on September 12. Munsil received 51% of the vote, while Goldwater garnered 40%. Mike Harris earned 6% and Gary Tupper mustered 4%.

In the general election, just 8 weeks later, Munsil was defeated by incumbent Governor Janet Napolitano by a 63% to 35% margin.

History of opinion polls for election
Zogby/Wall Street Journal – September 19–25, 2006, likely voters, +/-4%

Cronkite-Eight – September 21–24, 2006, registered voters, +/-3%

Rasmussen Reports – September 18, 2006, likely voters

Survey USA – September 16–18, 2006, likely voters, +/-4.6%

References

External links

 Len Munsil's Daily Blog
 

1963 births
Arizona lawyers
Arizona Republicans
Living people
The Dallas Morning News people
Walter Cronkite School of Journalism and Mass Communication alumni
Politicians from Phoenix, Arizona